West Green Harbour, Nova Scotia  is a community of the Municipality of the District of Shelburne in the Canadian province of Nova Scotia.

References
West Green Harbour on Destination Nova Scotia
Photo Fisheries and Oceans Canada

Communities in Shelburne County, Nova Scotia
General Service Areas in Nova Scotia